Nizhnesolonovsky is a rural locality (a khutor) in Verkhnesolonovskoye Rural Settlement, Surovikinsky District, Volgograd Oblast, Russia. The population was 75 as of 2010.

Geography 
Nizhnesolonovsky is located 34 km south of Surovikino (the district's administrative centre) by road. Verkhnesolonovsky is the nearest rural locality.

References 

Rural localities in Surovikinsky District